Blairsville Precinct, formerly township, is Congressional Township 8 South, Range 1 East of the Third Principal Meridian located in Williamson County, Illinois. It is named for the village of Blairsville, Illinois.

References

Townships in Williamson County, Illinois
Precincts in Illinois